Habrocestum speciosum is a jumping spider species in the genus Habrocestum that lives on the Socotra archipelago off the coast of Yemen. It was first described in 1994.

References

Endemic fauna of Socotra
Salticidae
Spiders described in 1994
Spiders of Asia
Taxa named by Wanda Wesołowska